The Touryst is an action-adventure puzzle game developed and published by Shin'en Multimedia. It was announced during Nintendo's Indie World stream on August 19, 2019 and was released on November 21, 2019 for Nintendo Switch and July 30, 2020 for Xbox One and Microsoft Windows. An enhanced version of the game released for Xbox Series X/S as a launch title on November 10, 2020. The art style is blocky and makes use of voxel art techniques. The game uses a custom engine developed by Shin'en, which allows the game to deliver high-fidelity graphical effects while still maintaining a smooth framerate. The game was voted as one of the four most loved eShop games of 2019. The PlayStation 4 and PlayStation 5 versions were released on September 9, 2021.

Development 
While working on Fast RMX, the development team wanted to create an adventure game based around the concept of strange things happening on a vacation. The gameplay was designed so that the player could choose to play the activities that interested them. The voxel visual style was inspired by NES and SNES games, but in 3D environments. Shin'en used the voxel editor Magicavoxel to create the game's models, which were then imported into Maya. The game was designed with Shin'en's in-house engine, allowing the developers to focus on optimizing for a smooth framerate. Development on the game took around three years to complete.

Reception 

The Touryst received "generally favourable reviews" for the Nintendo Switch and Xbox One versions, according to review aggregator Metacritic.

References

External links
 

2019 video games
Action-adventure games
Nintendo Switch games
Puzzle video games
PlayStation 4 games
PlayStation 5 games
Video games developed in Germany
Xbox One games
Windows games
Video games with voxel graphics
Video games set on fictional islands
Xbox Cloud Gaming games
Xbox Series X and Series S games
Indie video games
Works about vacationing